John Hornley was the first recorded President of Magdalen College, Oxford  serving from 8 August 1448 until his death on 25 September 1457.

References

Year of birth unknown
1457 deaths
Presidents of Magdalen College, Oxford
15th-century English people